Kotla Vijaya Bhaskara Reddy Botanical Garden or Hyderabad Botanical Garden is a botanical garden is located in Kothaguda, Kondapur, Hitec City, Hyderabad. It was developed by the Telangana Forest Department and is near the HITEC City, Madhapur,  from Hyderabad Railway station on the Hyderabad-Mumbai old Highway. The park is named after Kotla Vijaya Bhaskara Reddy, former chief minister of Andhra Pradesh.

The garden
The botanical garden aims at providing the facility of a modern botanical garden to conserve and develop the germ plasm and to educate the people. The first phase is open to the public, with the completion of five sections. The sections include medicinal plants, timber trees, fruit trees, ornamental plants, aquatic plants, bamboos and so on. The park is designed to have large water bodies, rolling meadows, natural forests, rich grasslands and exquisite rock formations.

In July 2018, Telangana minister K. T. Rama Rao inaugurated the newly developed recreational facilities at the botanical garden such as Nakshatra Vanam, Rasi Vanam and Navagraha Vanam.

Location
An eco-tourist destination, the botanical garden is in Kothaguda, Kondapur, near the Hi-tech City, approximately 16 kilometers from Hyderabad. Tents are available for longer visits. The nearest landmarks to this botanical Garden are Spar (retailer) Hypermarket, The Platina, Radisson Hotel and Ambicare Clinics, White Fields.

The paved walkways take you through the 19 sections (Vanaja) in the Patil. The bamboo and palm sectors are major attractions, with varieties of bamboo trees separated by a  distance. Special signboards are erected at each bamboo variety indicating its generic and scientific names. The palm sector has diverse species. Here you can find a variety of flowers in abundance, such as yellow and purple cosmos, blue salvia, red raselia, etc.

See also

 Nehru Zoological Park
 Biodiversity park, Hyderabad
 Biodiversity Park, Visakhapatnam

References

External links

 Birds of Hyderabad
 Flora of Hyderabad
 Butterflies of Hyderabad

Urban public parks
Parks in Hyderabad, India
Gardens in India